Yoann Martelat (born 16 January 1997) is a French footballer who now plays for Salaise in his home country.

Career
Martelat started his senior career with Olympique Lyonnais. In 2019, he signed for FK Sloboda Tuzla in the Premier League of Bosnia and Herzegovina, where he made ten league appearances and scored zero goals. After that, he signed for Salaise, where he now plays.

References

External links 
 Martelat about the period at FC Liberty: It was a disaster, I had nothing
 Joan Martelat for "Avaz": I'm pleasantly surprised by the football playing in BiH 
 Yoann Martelat (ex-OL) : "Playing professional? I don't think about it anymore"
 Yoann Martelat (ex-OL) signs in Salaise: "Regain rhythm by chaining sessions and matches"

Living people
1997 births
French footballers
French expatriate footballers
Expatriate footballers in Bosnia and Herzegovina
Olympique Lyonnais players
FK Sloboda Tuzla players
Association football midfielders